Harald Braem alias Wolfram vom Stein (born 23 July 1944 in Berlin) is a German writer, designer and professor who specializes in color psychology.

Mr. Braem spent his childhood in Allendorf, Westerwald. He attended primary and secondary school in Hildesheim and later studied graphic design in Hildesheim and Hannover.

He has worked as a teacher, carried out comparative cultural investigations about matters related to archaeology and ancient history in the Canary Islands and the Egyptian pyramids, as well as conducted research pertaining to shamanism and cave painting.

Life 
Harald Braem spent his childhood in Allendorf, located in the Westerwald. Beginning in 1949, he attended primary and secondary school in Hildesheim. In 1962 he began his instruction in drawing and graphic arts at the Fachhochschule Hildesheim/Holzminden/Göttingen or HAWK, a communication arts school in Hildesheim, then at a college for the advertising arts in Hannover. Subsequently, he worked as an advertising agency copywriter and creative director and from 1981 until 2000 as a graphic design professor at a vocational school in Wiesbaden. His area of expertise is Color psychology.

Harald Braem is a member of the Berufsverband Deutscher Psychologinnen und Psychologen, an occupational organization for German psychologists. In 2005 he received the Verdienstmedaille des Landes Rheinland-Pfalz, a medal of merit granted to him by the German State of Rheinland-Pfalz. In 2006 he founded Das Institut für Farbpsychologie, (Institute for Color Psychology) in Bettendorf. He has written numerous technical books and articles, among others, the standard work "Die Macht der Farben", ("The Power of Colors"). However, his avid interest as a writer extends much further, with published works ranging from poetry to fantasy to historical novels.

Beside his duties as an instructor, Braem had done extensive work in the areas of folklore, comparative cultural studies and archeology. Of particular interest to him is the ancient and early history of the Canary Islands, pyramids, shamanism, cave paintings and petroglyphs.

Since 1988 Braem has headed the Kult-Ur-Institut für interdisziplinäre Kulturforschung in his place of residence, Bettendorf, located in the state of Rheinland-Pfalz
He is a curator for the World Heritage Museum in Bettendorf und the initiator of many cultural projects. Some examples are the Nassauer Kulturpreis, the Nastätter Literaturtage, the Förderkreis Keltenhof Bettendorf, the Limeskastell Pohl, and the Kunst- & Literaturpfad Loreley or KLP.

Prizes
2005: Verdienstmedaille des Landes Rheinland-Pfalz

Works 
 Ein blauer Falter über der Rasierklinge, Frankfurt am Main [u.a.] 1980
 "Die Nacht der verzauberten Katzen" und andere Geschichten, Frankfurt am Main [u.a.] 1982
 Die letzten 48 Stunden, München 1983 (with Wolfgang Fienhold)
 Die Macht der Farben, München 1985
 Träume in Blech und Papier, Bern [u.a.] 1985 (with Manfred Schmidtke)
 Das große Guten-Morgen-Buch, Göttingen 1985
 Brainfloating, München 1986
 Morgana oder Die Suche nach der Vergangenheit, München 1986
 Sirius grüßt den Rest der Welt, München 1987
 Der Eidechsenmann, München 1988
 Auf den Spuren atlantischer Völker: Die Kanarischen Inseln, München 1988 (with Marianne Braem)
 Der Löwe von Uruk, München [u.a.] 1988
 Selftiming, München 1988
 Zodiak, München 1988
 Die Balearen, München 1989
 Ein Sommer aus Beton, Würzburg 1989
 Hem-On, der Ägypter, München [u.a.] 1990
 Der Kojote im Vulkan, Berlin 1990
 Die Sprache der Formen, München 1990
 Tanausu - der letzte König der Kanaren, München [u.a.] 1991
 Große Spinne, kleine Spinne, Kaiserslautern 1992
 Das magische Dreieck, Stuttgart [u.a.] 1992
 Bibliographie des deutschsprachigen Schrifttums zur internationalen Felsbildforschung, Lollschied 1994 (with Thomas Schulte im Walde)
 Der Herr des Feuers, München [u.a.] 1994
 Die magische Welt der Schamanen und Höhlenmaler, Köln 1994
 Der Vulkanteufel, Stuttgart [u.a.] 1994
 Das Hotel zum Schwarzen Prinzen, München [u.a.] 1995
 Magische Riten und Kulte, Stuttgart [u.a.] 1995
 Der Wunderberg, Stuttgart [u.a.] 1996
 Der König von Tara, Stuttgart [u.a.] 1997
 Paläste, Tempel, Hieroglyphen, Bindlach 1997 (with Christof Heil)
 An den Küsten der Sehnsucht, Bettendorf 1999
 Das blaue Land, Stuttgart [u.a.] 2000
 Frogmusic, Plön 2001
 Meine Steppe brennt, Bettendorf 2006

External links 
 www.haraldbraem.de
 

1944 births
Writers from Berlin
Living people
German male writers